The Little Hour of Peter Wells is a 1921 Dutch silent film directed by Maurits Binger.

Cast
 O. B. Clarence as Peter Wells
 Heather Thatcher as Camille Pablo
 Hebden Foster as Carlos Faroa
 Adelqui Migliar as Pranco
 Willem Hunsche as King Enrico
 Nico De Jong as Raoul Pablo
 Jan Kiveron as Faroa's lieutenant
 Fred Homann

External links 
 

1921 films
Dutch silent feature films
Dutch black-and-white films
Films directed by Maurits Binger